Saskatoon West is a federal electoral district in Saskatchewan, Canada, that was represented in the House of Commons of Canada from 1979 to 1988, and again in 2015.

This riding was created in 1976 from parts of Moose Jaw and Saskatoon—Biggar ridings.

It was abolished in 1987 when it was redistributed into Kindersley—Lloydminster, Saskatoon—Clark's Crossing and Saskatoon—Dundurn ridings.

The riding was recreated for the 2015 election, mostly out of the portions of Saskatoon—Rosetown—Biggar and Saskatoon—Wanuskewin located in the city of Saskatoon.

Boundaries Description 
Consisting of those parts of the Province of Saskatchewan and the City of Saskatoon described as follows: commencing at the intersection of Highway No. 11 with Range Road 3052; thence southerly along Range Road 3052 and Wanuskewin Road to the easterly limit of the City of Saskatoon; thence generally southerly along said limit to Wanuskewin Road at approximate latitude 52°11'43"N and longitude 106°37'23"W; thence generally southerly along said road and Warman Road to 33rd Street East; thence easterly along said street and its production to the South Saskatchewan River; thence generally southwesterly along said river to the southerly limit of the City of Saskatoon; thence southwesterly, generally northwesterly and generally northeasterly along the southerly, westerly and northerly limits of said city to Beam Road; thence easterly and northeasterly along said road to Marquis Drive; thence easterly along said drive to Thatcher Avenue; thence northerly along said avenue to 71st Street West; thence easterly along said street to Highway No. 11 (the northwesterly limit of the City of Saskatoon); thence northerly and northeasterly along said highway and said limit to the point of commencement.

Demographics
According to the 2021 Census

Ethnic groups (2021): 55% White, 18.2% Aboriginal, 10.2% Filipino, 6.8% South Asian, 3.1% Black, 2.3% Southeast Asian, 1.3 Latin American, 1.1% Chinese 
Languages (2021): 73.6% English, 5.6% Tagalog, 1.6% Punjabi, 1.2% Urdu, 1.1% Spanish, 1% Bengali
Religions (2021): 51.3% Christian (25.1% Catholic, 4.3% United Church, 2.2% Anglican, 1.9% Lutheran, 1.4% Christian Orthodox, 1.4% Pentecostal and other Charismatic, 1.2% Anabaptist, 1.1% Baptist), 38% No religion, 4.7% Muslim, 1.9% Sikh, 1.1% Traditional Spirituality, 1% Hindu
Median income (2021): $39,200 
Median after-tax income (2021): $35,600

Average income (2021): $46,000
Average after-tax income (2021): $39,840

Members of Parliament
This riding has elected the following members of the House of Commons of Canada:

Election results

2015–present

1979–1988

Riding Map (Official Boundaries Map) 

A detailed map can be found on the Elections Canada website

See also 
 List of Canadian federal electoral districts
 Past Canadian electoral districts

References

External links 
 

Former federal electoral districts of Saskatchewan
Saskatchewan federal electoral districts
Politics of Saskatoon
1976 establishments in Saskatchewan
1987 disestablishments in Saskatchewan
2013 establishments in Saskatchewan